The 6N1P is a Russian-made miniature 9-pin medium gain double triode vacuum tube intended for use as a line audio amplifier and cathode driver.

Basic data:
 Uf = 6.3 V, If = 600 mA
 μ = 35
 Ia = 7.5 mA
 S = 4.35 mA/V
 Pa = 2.2 W

The 6N1P has similar ratings to the 6DJ8 and in the past was sometimes rebranded as such, however differences between the two types (the 6N1P requires almost twice the filament current and has only one third the S value) mean they are not directly interchangeable. The S is about 4.35 ma/V, the 6DJ8/ECC88 has a S of 12.5 ma/V and a gain of 33 and a lower internal resistance. However, the 6N1P is typically more linear for a given load. It is therefore inaccurate to say that these two tubes are identical.
The correct Russian equivalent to the 6DJ8/ECC88 is the 6N23P, the latter has a S of 12.5 mA/V and a gain of 33.

The closest western equivalent to the 6N1P is the well known 6BQ7A. A ruggedized/extended ratings version of the tube is designated 6N1P-EV. It has currently found a use as a driver tube in hi-fi tube amplifiers (such as Audio Research models VS55 and VS110) because of its excellent low distortion and low noise characteristics. The tube is manufactured by the "Voskhod" plant in Kaluga, Russia (see ) and is distributed in the West under the Sovtek and Svetlana brand names.

See also 
6DJ8
6N2P
6N3P

References 
  - 6N1P datasheet and specifications.
  - 6N1P detailed datasheet in Russian

External links 
Svetlana - 6N1P Russian manufacturer.
 - 6N1P and 6N2P usage notes.
 - Russian/Soviet tube manufacturers and their logos.
 - Audio Research VS55 amplifier.

Vacuum tubes

ru:Двойные триоды